Basketball Challenge is a computer game developed by the XOR Corporation in 1987 for the IBM PC and compatibles.

Gameplay
The player is the coach of a basketball team, and determines the plays and sets, offense and defense. The basketball players are represented by numbers on the onscreen court, and the coach must learn how to effectively use the team's stars and how to obtain the best performance from the regular players. Basketball Challenge can be played by one or two players, or the computer can also play against a human opponent or run the entire game as both players. At the beginning of the game the player is given the option to choose offensive and defensive plays including lineup and tempo. During the game you have the ability to communicate with team players. You also have the ability to coach a player and this can lead to changing tactics or even substituting players during deadball.

Reception
In 1988, Dragon gave the game 3½ out of 5 stars. Computer Gaming World recommended Basketball Challenge to "those who have always wanted to be college coaches", with its strategic depth compensating for the lack of graphics.

References

1987 video games
Basketball video games
Video games developed in the United States